Anne Søndergaard (born 5 June 1973) is a Danish badminton player, born in Hjørring. 

Søndergaard competed in women's singles at the 1996 Summer Olympics in Atlanta.

References

External links

1973 births
Living people
Danish female badminton players
Olympic badminton players of Denmark
Badminton players at the 1996 Summer Olympics
People from Hjørring
Sportspeople from the North Jutland Region
20th-century Danish women
21st-century Danish women